Eskimo is a Norwegian–Danish adventure and drama film from 1930 directed by George Schnéevoigt. It starred Mona Mårtenson, Paul Richter, and Henki Kolstad, for whom it was his film debut at age 14. Had it not been for the fact that Denmark was also involved in the production, Eskimo would have been considered the first feature-length Norwegian sound film (rather than Den store barnedåpen from 1931). The language in the film is Norwegian.

Plot
Jack Norton is a gambler, and his father often lends him money to pay off his gambling debts. Finally, his father's patience runs out. He refuses to lend him more money, and he no longer wants to acknowledge Jack as his son. In desperation, Jack takes a motorboat and sails to sea. His boat sinks, but he is picked up by a fishing vessel on its way to the Arctic Ocean. The captain is a brutal man, and both he and the crew treat Jack badly. The only exception is the cabin boy Jimmy, who eventually becomes close friends with Jack. When the captain beats Jimmy one day, Jack comes to his rescue. But in the conflict that follows, Jimmy is shot and killed.

Jack can no longer bear to be on the ship after this, and one night he escapes by jumping onto a large ice floe. He remains on the ice floe for several days and nights, before he finally arrives exhausted in Greenland. He is kindly received by the Eskimos there, and the young beautiful girl Ekaluk falls in love with him. At first, Jack is not particularly interested in her, but, when he falls ill with scurvy and is cared for by her, he falls in love. He intends to return home with a merchant ship that has arrived at the island. But he understands that he cannot manage without Ekaluk, and therefore he considers staying with the Eskimos.

Cast

 Mona Mårtenson as Eukaluk
 Paul Richter as Jack Norton
 Ada Kramm as Annie
 Knut Christian Langaard as the captain
 Finn Bernhoft as the mate
 Henki Kolstad as Jimmy, the cabin boy
 Tryggve Larssen as Sulurak, Eukaluk's father
 Haakon Hjelde as Majrak, a great hunter
 Adam Poulsen as the reader of the prologue (voice)
 Josef Dischner  
 Aud Egede-Nissen as Luder
 Rudolf Klein-Rogge as Mariak
 Paul Rehkopf
 Ada Schramm

References

External links
 
 Eskimo at the National Library of Norway
 Eskimo at Filmfront
 Eskimo at the Swedish Film Database
 Eskimo at the Danish Film Database

1930 romantic drama films
Norwegian black-and-white films
Norwegian adventure drama films
Norwegian romantic drama films
1930s Norwegian-language films